Route 126 is a  north–south state highway in Massachusetts. Its southern terminus is a continuation of Rhode Island Route 126 by Woonsocket, Rhode Island and its northern terminus is at Route 2 and Route 2A in Concord. Along the way it intersects several major routes including Interstate 495 (I-495) in Bellingham, Route 9 in Framingham, and U.S. Route 20 (US 20) in Wayland.

Route description
Route 126 begins at the Rhode Island state line, continuing into Woonsocket as Rhode Island Route 126.  After a short stretch in the town of Blackstone and Worcester County, Route 126 enters the town of Bellingham and Norfolk County, heading north.  In Bellingham, Route 126 has a short concurrency with Route 140 at the center of town.  In the north of the town, the route turns east on Hartford Avenue, crossing I-495 at Exit 18.  Shortly after entering the town of Medway, the route turns north again, crossing Route 109 shortly after that.  Route 126 then enters Holliston, in Middlesex County.

After splitting from Route 16, Route 126 heads north into Ashland, passing through the eastern side of town before entering Framingham. The route passes Waushakam Pond before crossing Route 135 near the center of town, next to the Framingham MBTA station. The road bears to the right, passing Gleason Pond before crossing over Route 9 with exit ramps between the two. At this point, Route 30 eastbound joins Route 126 for a short stretch before meeting Route 30 westbound. Route 126 continues northward, crossing the Massachusetts Turnpike (I-90) without junction. (The nearest exit along the Pike is on Route 30 to the east.)

As it passes Lake Cochituate, Route 126 enters the town of Wayland.  The route then joins Route 27 for a mile, crossing U.S. Route 20 together just before the two routes split.  Route 126 then enters the town of Lincoln.  After crossing Route 117, the route continues north, crossing the Fitchburg Line before entering Concord.  As the route rounds the banks of Walden Pond through the State Reservation, it finally ends at Routes 2 and 2A next to Concord-Carlisle Regional High School.

Major intersections

References

External links

126
Transportation in Middlesex County, Massachusetts
Transportation in Norfolk County, Massachusetts
Transportation in Worcester County, Massachusetts
Holliston, Massachusetts
Ashland, Massachusetts
Framingham, Massachusetts
Wayland, Massachusetts
Lincoln, Massachusetts
Concord, Massachusetts